The  (CNRTL) is a French organisation which publishes linguistic data and information online.

History and description 
This project is incorporated into the European project CLARIN.

The database is expanded with the help of voluntary sources who wish to make viable and release linguistic content and who accept the charter produced by the CNRTL. If necessary, the CNRTL can contribute to the formatting of the information available online. The contributions are eventually validated by the proofreading committee of the CNRTL and the sources, and then published. The goal is to disseminate the largest possible amount of resources, and for the resources to be as reliable as possible.

The version of the site as it was on 1 January 2008 is the second version. The site can receive more than 500 000 visitors per day.

The site has not been updated since 2012.

External links 
 Official website (in French)

References 

2005 establishments in France
University of Lorraine
Online dictionaries
French-language websites
French websites
Online databases
Scientific agencies of the government of France
French National Centre for Scientific Research